Arizona State Route 303 (SR 303) or Loop 303, also known as the Bob Stump Memorial Parkway (formerly the Estrella Freeway), is a freeway that serves the west part of the Phoenix metropolitan area. The freeway, originally a two-lane rural highway, was maintained by Maricopa County until 2004 when the Arizona Department of Transportation again took control of upgrading the interim road to a freeway.

Route description 
Loop 303 currently begins at Van Buren Street, one mile south of I-10 in Goodyear. It becomes a six-lane freeway with a stack interchange at I-10. South of Van Buren Street it continues as Cotton Lane but without a route number. The freeway heads north under McDowell and Thomas Roads, then over an interchange with Indian School Road. It then proceeds through a farmland terrain and passes by the Wildlife World Zoo near the Northern Parkway trumpet interchange. After passing Northern Parkway, the freeway continues for a few miles before entering a residential community at Greenway Road and turning northeast. It passes above Grand Avenue (US 60) and a BNSF railraod line at a parclo interchange. The freeway turns eastward north of Sun City West before turning north again at the Happy Valley Parkway interchange. It turns east again south of Lake Pleasant at the Agua Fria River. Following the Lake Pleasant Parkway interchange, the freeway condenses down to four lanes and passes through planned arterial interchanges. The freeway comes to an end at a temporary at-grade interchange (eventually to be a freeway-to-freeway interchange) with I-17 near Skunk Creek. East of this interchange, Loop 303 becomes Sonoran Desert Drive. The southern portion between US 60 to I-10 is used to bypass Grand Avenue, and the whole route is used to bypass the Phoenix Metropolitan Area.

History

1985–1995
Loop 303 was originally a part of the 1985 Maricopa County Regional Transportation Plan that was funded by a sales tax approved by Maricopa County voters. The freeway, designed to serve the Northwest Valley, was originally designated SR 517 in 1985; the Loop 303 designation was first assigned on December 18, 1987. The interim two-lane highway was completed between US 60 and I-10 in 1991, marking the first road along the Loop 303 corridor. The freeway was scheduled to be completed sometime by 2005. However, funding shortfalls and increasing construction costs forced cutbacks in the plan, and in 1995 the freeway was dropped from the regional plans.

1995–2004
Maricopa County took charge of SR 303 when it was dropped from the regional freeway plans in 1995, maintaining the interim two-lane highway along the original corridor while keeping the state route designation. The county then made significant improvements to the highway, extending it from US 60 to Happy Valley Parkway in 2004 as a four-lane divided parkway. SR 303 was still largely a two-lane rural road and the only sections as a four-lane divided parkway was the extension north of US 60, and the southern terminus just north of I-10 between Indian School and McDowell Roads. The segment between US 60 and Bell Road in Surprise was partially upgraded to freeway standards in 2004 with overpasses at Clearview Boulevard and Mountain View Boulevard. An interim interchange and bridge above US 60 were also built at the same time. In May 2004, SR 303 was renamed the "Bob Stump Memorial Parkway" in honor of former Arizona congressman Bob Stump.

2004–2011
With the extension of the sales tax approved in 2004, SR 303 was taken back over by the Arizona Department of Transportation (ADOT) and added back to the regional transportation plan. As Maricopa County had completed much of the required study and preparation work, construction on the freeway proceeded with a planned completion date of the I-10 to I-17 segment by 2015. According to an agreement between the state legislature and ADOT, Statewide Transportation Acceleration Needs (STAN) funds were used to build a partial interchange at Bell Road in summer 2010, several years before previously intended. Funds from this were also used to upgrade the crossings at Waddell and Cactus Roads to make way for the new freeway.

In 2009, construction began on the 14-mile segment between Happy Valley Parkway and I-17. In May 2011, this segment opened as a four-lane freeway with interchanges at Happy Valley Parkway, Lone Mountain Parkway (not opened until 2012), and Lake Pleasant Parkway. Motorists still have to pass through signaled ramp junctions at I-17 until a full freeway-to-freeway interchange is built.

2011–present
Beginning in mid-2011, ADOT began upgrading Loop 303 between US 60 and I-10 from a two-lane highway to a six-lane freeway with auxiliary lanes and interchanges. In August 2011, construction began on the six-mile segment between Mountain View Boulevard and Peoria Avenue. This segment was completed in fall 2013 with interchanges at Bell, Greenway, Waddell, and Cactus Roads as well as Peoria Avenue.

In November 2011, construction began on the north half of the I-10 and Loop 303 stack interchange. Construction was completed in August 2014 with the opening of all of the north half ramps. The McDowell Road bridge was also completed during this time.

In May 2012, construction began on the seven-mile segment between Peoria Avenue and Thomas Road. This segment was fully completed in August 2014 with a trumpet interchange at Northern Parkway (opened in late 2013) along with other interchanges at every arterial road except Olive Avenue.

In August 2014, construction began on the seven-mile segment between US 60 and Happy Valley Parkway to upgrade it to freeway standards. The first part was to upgrade the roadway to three lanes in each direction; it was complete in summer 2015. The second part was to construct a parclo interchange at the US 60. This part began in December 2014 and was complete in spring 2016. The final part was to construct the El Mirage interchange. This began in February 2015 and was complete in summer 2016. This marked the first time the entire Loop 303 between I-10 and I-17 was fully upgraded to freeway standards.

In February 2016, construction began on the south half of the I-10 and Loop 303 stack interchange. Construction was complete in October 2017 with the opening of all of the south half ramps along with the Van Buran Street interchange.

In December 2020, construction began to widen the six-mile segment between Happy Valley Parkway and Lake Pleasant Parkway from two to three lanes in each direction. It was completed with the opening of the Jomax Parkway exit in Peoria in January 2022.

In October 2022, construction began to build the interchanges at 51st Avenue and 43rd Avenue. Construction is expected to be completed in late 2023.

Future 
A new segment of Loop 303 is planned to begin construction in 2024. It is the 2.5-mile segment south of Van Buren Street to Elwood Street along the Cotton Lane alignment. It will consist of building three lanes in each direction along with interchanges at Yuma Road and Elwood Street. There will be frontage roads along this entire segment to provide access to local communities. Bridges will be built over Lilac Street/Canyon Trails Boulevard and Lower Buckeye Road, and access will be via the frontage roads. 

Loop 303 is planned to continue south of Elwood Street and connect to the future SR 30 in Goodyear. Construction of that segment will be around the same time as that portion of SR 30, and the timeline is currently unknown.

A full freeway-to-freeway interchange will be built at the Loop 303 and I-17. The goal is for construction to begin sometime in 2028. Loop 303 has been built to accommodate four-general purpose lanes, one HOV lane, and one auxiliary lane in order to expand in the future.

Long-term plans include the Loop 303 to continue south of SR 30 to the future I-11 Hassayampa Freeway. Most of this extension would be in Goodyear and would be built around the same time as that portion of I-11.

Exit list
Exit numbering is arbitrary.

See also
 
 
 Roads and freeways in metropolitan Phoenix
 Loop 101
 Loop 202

References

External links
 

303
303
Transportation in Maricopa County, Arizona